Tere Bina Jiya Jaaye Na is a Hindi Indian television drama series which premiered on 9 November 2021 on Zee TV and digital platform ZEE5. It stars Avinesh Rekhi, Anjali Tatrari and Rakshanda Khan. It replaced Kyun Rishton Mein Katti Batti. It went off air on 19th August 2022.

Cast

Main 
 Avinesh Rekhi as 
 Devraj Singh Rathore – Prince of Ambikapur; Dakshraj's brother; Krisha's husband; Roma and Vamika's love interest (2021–2022)
 Dakshraj Singh Rathore – Devraj's twin brother; Maya's love interest (2022) (Dead)
 Anjali Tatrari as 
 Krisha Singh Rathore – Sudha and Vishwanath's daughter; Yash's sister; Devraj's wife (2021–2022)
 Maya – Krisha's lookalike; Dakshraj's love interest (2022) (Dead)
 Rakshanda Khan as Jayalakshmi Singh – Devraj and Dakshraj's governess; Bhuvan's wife; Vamika's mother (2021–2022)
 Garima Singh Rathore as Vamika Singh – Jayalakshmi and Bhuvan's daughter; Maan's adopted daughter; Devraj's obsessed lover (2022) (Dead)

Recurring 
 Karuna Verma / Shweta Gautam as Sudha Chaturvedi – Vishwanath's wife; Krisha and Yash's mother 
 Aashish Bharadwaj as Yash Chaturvedi – Vishwanath and Sudha's son; Krisha's brother
 Saptrishi Ghosh as Vishwanath Chaturvedi – Sudha's husband; Krisha and Yash's father 
 Deepak Wadhwa as Jahangir Chaudhary – a contract killer/Akhil Mehra – a fake police inspector (2022) (Dead)
 Deepa Mishra as Aditi – Aarav's love interest
 Farah Lakhani as Naina Chaubey
 Riya Deepsi  as Roma (2021-2022)
 Romil Chaudhary as Raghav Chaubey
 Utkarsha Naik as Meenakshi Gajvardhan Singh Rathore
 Leenesh Mattoo  as Aarav Singh Rathore (2021-2022) (Dead)
 Simran Sharma as Rati Raghav Chaubey
 Leena Balodi as Ugra Chaubey
 Dhananjay Pandey
 Sandeep Hemnaoni as Gajvardhan Singh Rathore
 Rudra Kaushish as Veerendra Singh Rathore 
 Deepak Dutt Sharma
 Vikas Vasu 
 Kriti Verma
 Girish Thapar
 Pinky Bankar as Aditi's mother 
 Manoj Verma as Aditi's father
 Sharad Ghore
 Mukesh Fotwani
 Praveen Panchal
 Nayan Bhatt 
 Aryan Arora
 Akshay Dandekar as Head Servant of Devraj

References

2021 Indian television series debuts
2022 Indian television series endings
Hindi-language television shows
Television shows set in Mumbai
Zee TV original programming